Artur Pastor (1 May 1922 in Alter do Chão – 17 September 1999 in Lisbon), was a Portuguese photographer.

Exhibitions 
He individually held 14 photography exhibitions with focus on the one that took place at Foz Palace in 1970 with 360 pieces of work, and at the Galveias Palace in 1986, involving 136 photographs. After his death 3 other exhibitions took place with his pieces of work.

"Motivos do Sul", with the theme Alentejo, Algarve and Serra de Arrábida, in Circulo Cultural of Algarve, Faro, January 1946 (300 photos)
at the information office of "Comissão Municipal de Turismo de Faro", Faro, in 1946
at the "Salão de Festas da Sociedade Recreativa Olhanense", Olhão, in 1946
"Motivos do Sul", with the theme Algarve, Setúbal and Alentejo, at the "Sociedade Harmonia Eborense", Évora, in June 1946
with the theme Alentejo, at the "Pátio Árabe da Casa do Alentejo", Lisbon, in May 1947
with the theme Setúbal's city and region, at the "Salão Nobre da Câmara Municipal de Setúbal", Setúbal, in July 1947
with the theme Algarve, Alentejo and Setubal, at the Barrocal Palace, Évora, in June 1949
with the theme Sesimbra's beach, at the shop windows of the Casa J. C. Alvarez, Lda., Augusta street, Lisbon, in October 1949
with the theme Albufeira's beach and people, at the shop windows of the Casa J. C. Alvarez, Lda., Augusta street, Lisbon, in August 1950
National Tourism Exhibition, at the Foz Palace, Lisbon, in 1953 (Collective Exhibition)
at the Salão Maior do Foz Palace, Lisbon, in December 1970 (360 photos)
with the theme snowy landscape in Tras-os-Montes, at the shop windows of the Casa J. C. Alvarez, Lisbon, in December 1974
"Apontamentos de Lisboa", with the theme Lisbon, at the Galveias Palace, Lisbon, in June 1986 (136 photos)
"Pequena Mostra de Fotografias de Artur Pastor", at the "Junta de Freguesia de Santiago", Lisbon, in November 1986
"Algarve (anos 50–60) Alguns Apontamentos", at the Art Galery "Pintor Samora Barros", Albufeira, in April 1998
"Artur Pastor 'O Domador da Rolleiflex'", at the galery "ColorFoto", Porto, in July 2006
"História(s) da Terra: Fotografias de Artur Pastor", at the Bread Museum, Seia, in October 2006
"A Nazaré de Artur Pastor", at the "Biblioteca Municipal da Nazaré", Nazaré, in November 2008

References

1922 births
Portuguese photographers
1999 deaths
People from Portalegre District